Marcus Holmgren Pedersen (born 16 July 2000) is a Norwegian professional footballer who plays as a right-back for Eredivisie club Feyenoord.

Club career

Early life
Hailing from Hammerfest, Pedersen started playing youth football in HIF/Stein. In 2016 he moved to Tromsø to attend the Norwegian School of Elite Sport there, and transferred to the youth section of Tromsø IL.

Tromsø
Pedersen got his debut for Tromsø when he came in as an 86th-minute substitute in a Norwegian Cup first round tie against Skjervøy on 18 April 2018.  He got his league debut in a 1–0 loss against Odd on 28 October 2018, and became the first player from Hammerfest to play in the top division of Norwegian football. 
On 5 May 2019, he received a red card for a professional foul and was sent off in the 88th minute of the game against Kristiansund.

Molde
On 11 February 2020, Pedersen signed a three-year contract with Molde.

Feyenoord
On 22 June 2021, Molde confirmed that they had sold Pedersen to Feyenoord, with the Dutch club confirming the arrival of the defender on a five-year contract the same day. He scored his first goal for the club on 18 February 2023, scoring the second goal in the 90th minute in a 2–1 win over AZ Alkmaar.

International career
Marcus Holmgren Pedersen played nine games and scored one goal for  Norway under-19. On 27 February 2019, he scored in his debut game against Denmark which Norway lost 2–1. Pedersen was a member of Norway's squad in the 2019 European Under-19 Championship and appeared in all three matches in the group stage.

He made his debut for the Norway national football team on 1 September 2021 in a World Cup qualifier against the Netherlands, a 1–1 home draw. He started the game and was substituted after an hour of play.

Career statistics

Club

Honours
Feyenoord
 UEFA Europa Conference League runner-up: 2021–22

References

External links

2000 births
Living people
People from Hammerfest
Norwegian footballers
Association football fullbacks
Norway youth international footballers
Norway under-21 international footballers
Norway international footballers
Tromsø IL players
Molde FK players
Feyenoord players
Eliteserien players
Eredivisie players
Norwegian expatriate footballers
Norwegian expatriate sportspeople in the Netherlands
Expatriate footballers in the Netherlands
Sportspeople from Troms og Finnmark